Mudmen are a Canadian rock band.

Mudmen or Mud Men may also refer to:
Asaro Mudmen, a Papua New Guinean tribe
Mud Men (TV series), a 2011 British factual TV series
Mudmen (instrumental), an instrumental track from Pink Floyd's 1972 album Obscured By Clouds
"Mud men", a term used by fairies to refer to humans in the Artemis Fowl series of novels by Eoin Colfer

See also
Mudman (disambiguation)